The Kuytun–Beitun railway or Kuibei railway is a single-track railway in Xinjiang, China between Kuytun and Beitun. The railway branches from the Northern Xinjiang railway at Kuytun and heads north across the Junggar Basin to Beitun, near Altay, passing through Karamay, Urho, and Fuhai (Burultoqay). The railway is 468.5 km in length The railway opened to freight traffic on December 29, 2009, and passenger traffic on June 1, 2011.

An extension of this railway toward Altay City opened in 2016. From Altay, the route continues as the Altay–Fuyun–Zhundong railway.

The Karamay–Tacheng railway (under construction as of  2017) branches off the Kuytun–Beitun railway at Baikouquan Station (百口泉站), and runs to 
Karamay, Emin County and Tacheng.

See also

 List of railways in China

References

Railway lines in China
Rail transport in Xinjiang
Railway lines opened in 2009